The Kilby International Awards was an award created by the High Tech Committee of the North Dallas Chamber of Commerce, in 1990 to boost interest in the area. It was named after inventor Jack Kilby. The awards were bestowed at the Chamber's annual "Salute to High Technology" dinners, except for the 2003 Awards, which were held in London.

Recipients 
Awards were granted in 1990–1998, 2000 and 2003.

1990
Truman Cook (Community Catalyst Award)
Mark Fulbright (Student Innovator Award)
Michael Hawley
Bell Helicopter Textron

1991
Wendy Copp (Young Innovator Award)
Apple Computer
EDS
Rockwell International
Tandy Corporation
Texas Instruments
Raytheon Corporation

1992
Drew Gaffney
Richard Smalley
John Hagelin
Fortune Education Summit

1993
Francis S. Collins
Candace B. Pert
George F. Smoot
Mae C. Jemison
K. Eric Drexler (Young Innovator Award)

1994
Robert D. Ballard
Dean Kamen
Stephanie L. Kwolek
Michael A. Zasloff
Mark A. Reed (Young Innovator Award)

1995
Vinton Cerf
Huda Zoghbi
Harry Orr
Hans Herren
Jewel Plummer Cobb (Lifetime Achievement in Education Award)
Tim Berners-Lee (Young Innovator Award)
Marc Hannah (Young Innovator Award)

1996
Steve Wozniak
Helen Murray Free (Lifetime Achievement Award)
Daniel Kaufman
E. Clayton Teague
Kay Toliver
Mike McCue (Young Innovator Award)

1997
James H. Clark
Hector Floyd DeLuca
Sylvia A. Earle
Barry Marshall
Francine Penny Patterson
Susan Athey (Young Innovator Award)

1998
Leonardo Chiariglione
Jennifer Harris (Young Innovator Award)
Florence P. Haseltine
Karl M. Johnson (Lifetime Achievement Award)
Zafra M. Lerman
William E. Strickland
Masashi Yanagisawa

2000
Michael Chasen (Young Innovator Award)
Matthew Pittinsky (Young Innovator Award)
Linus Benedict Torvalds (Young Innovator Award)
Frances Anne Cordova
Bran Ferren
Hendrik Mario Geysen
Margaret Lowman
Martin Schwab
Ada Yonath

2003
Onesmo K. ole-MoiYoi
Dame Bridget Ogilvie
Ralf David Hotchkiss
Mamphela Aletta Ramphele
Janna Levin (Young Innovator Award)

References 

Awards established in 1990
Awards disestablished in 2003